Eotripteroceras is a smooth-shelled michelinocerin orthocerid from the middle Ordovician of the state of New York.

The shell of Eotripteroceras is a depressed orthocone with the underside (the venter) flatter than the upper (the dorsum). The siphuncle is below the center -as viewed in horizontal orientation- and is cylindrical in form. Both siphuncle and chambers are empty.

References
 Sweet, Walter C. 1964. Nautiloidea-Orthocerida. Treatise on Invertebrate Paleontology, Part K. Geological Soc of America, and Univ Kansas Press.

Nautiloids